By Ward was one of the five original wards represented on Ottawa City Council, created in 1855 out of parts of East Ward and Centre Ward which existed in Bytown. Originally it represented the area between Rideau Street and St. Patrick Street. Today this area is part of the By Ward Market, which is named for the historic ward. 

In 1952, the ward annexed Ottawa Ward to its north, encompassing the neighbourhood of Lower Town as well.

The ward existed until 1972, when it merged with St. George's Ward to form By-St. George's Ward. This gave the Ward the Sandy Hill neighbourhood. 

In 1980, the area formerly known as By Ward split from St. George's and joined with Rideau Ward to become By-Rideau Ward. This ward existed until 1994 in which the By portion of the ward joined back with St. George's and became Bruyère-Strathcona Ward, which today is part of Rideau-Vanier Ward.

The ward was named for Colonel John By.

References

Ottawa wards
1972 disestablishments